The 7 November 1975 Bangladesh coup d'état was a coup d'état launched by left-wing army personnel in collaboration with left-wing politicians from Jatiya Samajtantrik Dal. The coup resulted in the death of Major General Khaled Mosharraf, who only 3 days prior, led a coup against those involved in the assassination of Sheikh Mujibur Rahman. During the coup, Ziaur Rahman was freed from house arrest, enabling him to seize power and become president.

Background
Sheikh Mujibur Rahman of the Awami League became the first president of Bangladesh after the 1971 Independence War. He was killed in the 15 August 1975 military coup and was replaced by Khondaker Mostaq Ahmad as the President of Bangladesh. Khondaker Mostaq Ahmad replaced the Bangladesh Army chief, Major General K M Shafiullah, with Major General Ziaur Rahman, the deputy Army chief. 

The army officers involved in Sheikh Mujib's assassination broke the army's chain of command, as these young officers 'began acting like generals' in the new Mostaq regime. Brigadier Khaled Mosharraf, the chief of general staff, had asked Ziaur Rahman to restore the chain of command in the army and Ziaur Rahman proved unwilling or unable to do so. As a result, Brigadier Khaled Mosharraf and other officers including Colonel Shafaat Jamil and Lieutenant Colonel A.T.M Haider removed Khondaker Mostaq Ahmad from power on 3 November 1975.

Khondaker Mostaq Ahmad requested that those involved in Sheikh Mujib's assassination should be allowed to safely leave Bangladesh, which Khaled Mosharraf agreed to. Before the assassins left, they killed several Awami league leaders including former Vice President Syed Nazrul Islam, former Prime Minister Muhammad Mansur Ali, former Minister Abul Hasnat Muhammad Qamaruzzaman and former prime minister Tajuddin Ahmed, who were imprisoned in Dhaka Central Jail after the 15 August military coup. Khondaker Mostaq Ahmad was replaced by the Chief Justice of Bangladesh, Abu Sadat Mohammad Sayem, who became the next President.

Events

Biplobi Shainik Sangstha (Revolutionary Soldier's Organisation) 
The Biplobi Shainik Sangstha (BSS) was a 'vaguely socialist and egalitarian' organisation in the Bangladesh Army, which was formed by Jatiya Samajtantrik Dal. On each night between 4 November and 6 November, secret meetings of the BSS were held under Colonel Taher's leadership. Colonel Taher was a retired army officer who joined the Jatiya Samajtantrik Dal and led its armed branches. On 5 November, the BSS distributed thousands of leaflets among soldiers and urban workers, in preparation of a general uprising. Furthermore, the BSS issued a list of 12 demands, which included the establishment of a classless armed forces, to facilitate the creation of a classless society. On the evening of 6 November, a meeting was held to finalise the plans for the uprising. There were to be two stages in the revolt, firstly to free Ziaur Rahman from detention and secondly, to implement the 12 demands of the BSS.

The uprising 
The revolt began soon after midnight on 7 November in Dhaka Cantonment, when Subedar Mehboob fired a single rifle shot, signalling the start of the uprising, which soon spread to other areas, including Rangpur and Chittagong. Crowds poured into the streets of Dhaka to support the soldiers and shouted slogans, such as 'The people and soldiers have united'. The mood in the city was described as 'exuberant' by Lawrence Lifschultz. Civilians and soldiers piled onto the tanks of the 1st Bengal Lancers regiment, which came out into the streets in support of the revolt.

Ziaur Rahman was freed from house arrest by soldiers and taken to the headquarters of the 2nd Field Artillery regiment, where he met Taher. Witnesses claim that Zia embraced Taher and thanked him for saving his life. After being freed, Zia reportedly signed a document, asserting his support of the 12 demands made by the BSS.

Deaths of Mosharraf, Haider and Huda 
Khaled Mosharraf  and his associates were at Bangabhaban when the uprising began. Upon realising that their 3 November coup had been undone, Khaled Mosharraf, A.T.M. Haider and Nazmul Huda left Bangabhaban to seek safety at the headquarters of the 10 Bengal Regiment. Although the soldiers of the 10 Bengal did not have any direct link to the Biplobi Shainik Sangstha, they came to know about the mutiny. The commanding officer of the 10 Bengal Regiment, Colonel Nawazesh, held a meeting with his fellow officers to decide whether Khaled Mosharraf and his companions should be allowed to come to the headquarters of the 10 Bengal Regiment. Two officers present at the meeting, Captain Asad and Captain Jalil, reportedly said 'Let the bastards come in, we'll sort them out'. Colonel Nawazesh received a phone call from Ziaur Rahman, who told Nawazesh to ensure the safety of Khaled Mosharraf and his companions.       

When Khaled Mosharraf, A.T.M. Haider and Nazmul Huda arrived at the 10 Bengal Regiment headquarters, Colonel Nawazesh ordered his troops not to harm the three officers. However, the troops were defiant and refused to listen to Colonel Nawazesh's orders. Fearing for his own life, Colonel Nawazesh did nothing to stop the soldiers from killing Khaled Mosharraf. An eyewitness claimed that Captain Asad and Captain Jalil ordered their troops to kill the three officers. Khaled Mosharraf and Nazmul Huda were dragged out of an office and killed by automatic gunfire, while A.T.M. Haider was killed by a single shot, after Haider tried to reach for his pistol.

Killings of other officers 
In Bangladesh: A Legacy of Blood, Anthony Mascarenhas wrote that the killings of other army officers began on 8 November. Many officers did not agree with the 12 demands of the BSS, which resulted in serious confrontations between officers and their troops. In Dhaka and Rangpur, 40 officers were killed by their troops and enlisted men were reported to have ripped badges off officer's lapels. 65% of all officers in Bangladesh lost control of their troops as a result of the uprising.

Restoring order 
On 24 November, Colonel Abu Taher, the mastermind of the uprising, was arrested for high treason and murder and was put on trial, along with 33 other members of Jatiya Samajtantrik Dal. On 17 July 1976, Taher was sentenced to death and was executed on 21 July 1976. In his final letter, Taher described Ziaur Rahman as a 'traitor' and claimed that he was freed from detention under Taher's orders.

Legacy

The Bangladesh Nationalist Party, which was founded by Ziaur Rahman after he became president, commemorates this day as National Revolution and Solidarity Day while the Bangladesh Awami League calls it Freedom Fighters Killing Day and views it negatively. The Bangladesh Nationalist Party called the military coup a civil military uprising.

Journalist Afsan Chowdhury described the uprising as the "closest that any Marxist force of whatever description in Bangladesh reached the doors of state power".

References

1970s coups d'état and coup attempts
1975 crimes in Bangladesh
1975 in Bangladesh
Military coups in Bangladesh
November 1975 events in Asia
1975 in military history
Violence in Bangladesh
Mutinies
Military history of Bangladesh
History of Bangladesh (1971–present)
1970s in Dhaka